Lollipops and Roses  is the debut studio pop album by singer and actor  Paul Petersen released in 1962 on Colpix Records and included 12 songs.  The album was available in both mono and stereo, catalogue numbers CP-429 and SCP-429. Lollipops and Roses was produced and arranged by Stu Phillips and was recorded at United Western Recorders in Hollywood, California.

Reception
Although the album failed to chart on the Billboard albums chart, the first single "She Can't Find Her Keys" was a hit that peakede at No. 19 on the Billboard Hot 100.
The second single "What Did They Do Before Rock 'N' Roll" featured a guest appearance with Shelley Fabares. The song "Keep Your Love Locked," was composed by the team of Gerry Goffin and Carole King.

Track listing

Side one

Side two

Re-release
Lollipops and Roses was released on compact disc in its entirety for the first time as part of a 2 LPs on 1-CD set released by Collectables in June 1999.

References

1962 debut albums
Paul Petersen albums
Colpix Records albums